Dagomba may refer to:
Dagomba people, an ethnic group of Northern Ghana
Dagomba language (Dagbani), a Gur language spoken in Ghana
"Dagomba", a song by Sorcerer, published in the music video game Just Dance 2

Language and nationality disambiguation pages